Hideout is a 1949 American thriller film directed by Philip Ford and written by John K. Butler. The film stars Lloyd Bridges, Lorna Gray, Ray Collins, Sheila Ryan, Chick Chandler and Jeff Corey. The film was released on March 8, 1949, by Republic Pictures.

Plot
A couple of thieves, Beecham and Evans, rob a Chicago socialite's diamond necklace. They give it to the man they're working for, Arthur Burdette, who promptly double-crosses them. A diamond expert who examines the necklace is then found dead.

Burdette slips away to a small Iowa town under an assumed name. When he hears city attorney George Browning has fired secretary Hannah Kelly, he offers Hannah a job. Browning has no idea that Burdette and Hannah are actually accomplices in crime, and pays no heed when new secretary Edie Hanson suggests that possibility.

Betrayed crooks Beecham and Evans show up, looking for Burdette and the necklace. Browning doesn't realize how involved Hannah is until she shoots the two thieves and ends up having the stolen necklace on her. Edie helps him get the better of Hannah and Burdette, also making Browning realize he's falling for the new girl.

Cast    
Lloyd Bridges as George Browning, aka Fogerty
Lorna Gray as Hannah Kelly, aka Betty
Ray Collins as Arthur Burdette
Sheila Ryan as Edie Hanson
Chick Chandler as Joe Bottomley 
Jeff Corey as Beecham
Alan Carney as Evans
Emory Parnell as Arnie Anderson
Don Beddoe as Dr. Hamilton Gibbs
Nana Bryant as Sybil Elwood Kaymeer
Charles Halton as Gabriel Wotter
Paul E. Burns as Pops 
Douglas Evans as Radio Announcer

References

External links 
 

1949 films
American thriller films
1940s thriller films
Republic Pictures films
Films directed by Philip Ford
American black-and-white films
1940s English-language films
1940s American films